These are the official results of the Women's 10,000 metres event at the 1990 European Championships in Split, Yugoslavia. The final was held on 31 August 1990.

Medalists

Final

Participation
According to an unofficial count, 27 athletes from 19 countries participated in the event.

 (1)
 (1)
 (1)
 (2)
 (1)
 (2)
 (1)
 (1)
 (1)
 (2)
 (1)
 (2)
 (1)
 (3)
 (1)
 (1)
 (3)
 (1)
 (1)

See also
 1988 Women's Olympic 10,000 metres (Seoul)
 1991 Women's World Championships 10,000 metres (Tokyo)
 1992 Women's Olympic 10,000 metres (Barcelona)

References

 Results

10000
10,000 metres at the European Athletics Championships
International athletics competitions hosted by Yugoslavia
1990 in women's athletics